Amedeo Bassi (29 July 1872 - 14 January 1949) was an Italian tenor.

Life and career
Born in Montespertoli, Bassi studied singing with Marquis Pavesi-Negri, and made his official debut in  1897, in Filippo Marchetti's opera Ruy Blas. Thanks to the immediate acclaim he received, he started an intense career in Italy, where he performed in the major opera houses of the time including La Scala in Milan and Teatro di San Carlo in Naples, and abroad, where he performed multiple times at the Royal Opera House, at the Metropolitan Opera House, at the Chicago Opera House, as well as in Paris, Vienna, Latin America, Russia, Spain. He retired from stage in the second half of the 1920s, and spent the rest of his life as a singing teacher, having among his pupils Ferruccio Tagliavini . In his hometown, he named a museum and a music festival.

References

Further reading

External links

 

1872 births
1949 deaths
People from the Province of Florence 
Italian tenors